Blood Ties, also known as Il cugino americano, which translates from the Italian as The American Cousin, is a 1986 Italian-American television film directed by Giacomo Battiato. It was shown at the 43rd Venice International Film Festival, where it was awarded as best television production.

The film is produced by RAI, Showtime and Viacom International.  It was shot in Palermo and New York City with a budget of about US$5 million.

The film was broadcast by Showtime on December 14, 1986.

Cast
 Brad Davis as Julian Salina
 Tony Lo Bianco as Judge Guiliano Salina
 Vincent Spano as  Mark Ciuni
 Barbara De Rossi as Louisa Masseria
 Arnoldo Foà as Vincenzo Ammirati
 Angelo Infanti as Romano
 Delia Boccardo as Sara Salina
 Ricky Tognazzi as Riccardo
 Michael V. Gazzo as Joseph Salina
 María Conchita Alonso as Caterina Ammirati
 Joe Spinell as Joey, New York Goon
 Elio Zamuto

References

External links

1986 television films
1986 films
American crime drama films
Films about the Sicilian Mafia
Films set in Sicily
1986 crime drama films
Films directed by Giacomo Battiato
American drama television films
1980s English-language films
1980s American films